Annie Golden (born October 19, 1951) is an American actress and singer. She first came to prominence as the lead singer of the punk band the Shirts from 1975 to 1981 with whom she recorded three albums. She began her acting career as Mother in the 1977 Broadway revival of Hair; later taking on the role of Jeannie Ryan in the 1979 film version of the musical. Other notable film credits include Desperately Seeking Susan (1985), Baby Boom (1987), Longtime Companion (1989), Strictly Business (1991), Prelude to a Kiss (1992), 12 Monkeys (1995), The American Astronaut (2001), It Runs in the Family (2003), Adventures of Power (2008), and I Love You Phillip Morris (2009).

Golden is best known for portraying mute Norma Romano in the Netflix comedy-drama streaming television series Orange Is the New Black from 2013 to 2019. In 1985–1986 she appeared as the recurring character Tommy in Miami Vice, and from 1989 to 1992 she portrayed the recurring role of Margaret O'Keefe on the classic sitcom Cheers. She has appeared as a guest star on several television programs, including American Playhouse, Dear John, Father Dowling Mysteries, High Maintenance, Law & Order, and True Blue among others.

She currently stars as Cinderella's Mother, Granny, and the Giant's Wife in the 2022 Broadway revival of Stephen Sondheim's Into the Woods .

Early life
Golden was born in Brooklyn, New York City, New York. She sang in school and church choirs as a child. Her father, a Teamster, died at age 52 and her mother died in 1974, at the age of 42. Golden on her family: "My mom never saw me do anything." She said that she "had no training." When she met Art LaMonica in 1971, he invited her to join his group called Lackeys & Schemers.

Career

Music 
Golden began her career as the lead singer of the Shirts. The band headlined CBGB in the late 1970s and recorded 3 albums for Capitol Records, The Shirts (1978), Street Light Shine (1979) and Inner Sleeve (1980). During the early 1990s she performed as part of the duo Golden Carillo with Frank Carillo. They released three albums, Fire in Newtown (1992), Toxic Emotion (1994), and Back for More (1997). She returned to the Shirts, but she has also performed solo and with a band. In 1984, her song "Hang Up the Phone" was featured on the soundtrack of the film Sixteen Candles. She performs a revue of songs from her stage career along with originals called Annie Golden's Velvet Prison.

Film and TV 
While with the Shirts, Golden was discovered by Miloš Forman, who gave her a part in Hair. She had featured roles on the television series Cheers and Miami Vice. Golden was the voice of Marina in the Don Bluth animated feature film The Pebble and the Penguin. She played a taxi driver in Terry Gilliam's 12 Monkeys (1995), wherein she had a scene with Bruce Willis and Madeline Stowe.

In recent years, she has been seen in commercials for Coinstar, in which she portrays the Tooth Fairy. She appears in the musical film Temptation with actor Adam Pascal, Tony Award winners Alice Ripley and Anika Noni Rose, and film actress Zoe Saldana and in 2009 had a small role in I Love You Phillip Morris with actors Ewan McGregor and Jim Carrey, playing a simple woman requiring legal assistance.

In 2013, she began playing the role of the nearly mute Norma Romano in the Netflix comedy-drama series Orange Is the New Black, for which she won a 2015 Screen Actors Guild Award (along with the rest of the ensemble cast).

Stage 
On Broadway, she has appeared in the 1977 revival of Hair, Leader of the Pack (1985), Ah, Wilderness! (1988), On the Town (1998), and The Full Monty (2000). She had the title role in the workshop of the short-lived adaptation of Stephen King's novel Carrie. She also played the role of Lynette "Squeaky" Fromme in Stephen Sondheim and John Weidman's musical Assassins during its world premiere at Playwrights Horizons in New York City in 1990–1991, and is featured on the cast recording of it, on the RCA label. In 2003 she joined other original off-Broadway cast members in a Reprise! (Los Angeles) concert production of Assassins. In 2007, she was stand-by for the two comic villain roles in the musical Xanadu on Broadway.

She played Lucy Schmeeler, the whiny friend with the chronic cold, in the off-Broadway Public Theater production at the Delacorte Theater of On the Town in August 1997. She also appeared in the lab production of the musical Hit the Lights! in 1993 at the Vineyard Theatre.

Golden has appeared in three separate versions of Hair: a Broadway revival in 1977, the motion picture in 1979 and a special benefit performance concert in 2004. Golden starred with Peter Scolari in the world premiere of The Nutcracker and I from November 29 to December 31, 2011, at the George Street Playhouse, New Brunswick, New Jersey. Comically playing the Sugar Rush Fairy (and three other roles) in this musical comedy featuring the music of Tchaikovsky and lyrics by Gerard Alessandrini, she and Scolari were compared in one review to the team of Imogene Coca and Sid Caesar.

Golden appeared in the musical Violet starring Sutton Foster on Broadway in 2014.

From May 4-15, 2022, Golden appeared as Cinderella's Mother/Granny/Giant's Wife in the Encores! production of Into the Woods at the New York City Center. The production transferred to the St. James Theatre on Broadway, opening on June 28, 2022. Golden stayed with the production until its closing on January 8, 2023.

Since 2005, Golden has frequently appeared in stage concerts for composer Joe Iconis. She starred in the Barrington Stage Company production of his Broadway Bounty Hunter, with the book by Iconis, Lance Rubin and Jason "Sweettooth" Williams, directed by Julianne Boyd, which opened on August 13, 2016. This role was written by Iconis for Golden; he said of Golden: "She's essentially playing a fictionalized version of herself, so she's been so helpful... Her personality has imbued the whole spirit of the show." The Variety reviewer wrote: "Golden does woebegone really well....Surprisingly, however, the show underserves its star... except for a rousing, climactic paean to “the blood... back in my veins,” the material isn't there... There's only limited chance to see her take full command of stage and story." The Boston Globe called the musical "rowdy, funny, cheerfully cockeyed." A concert version of Broadway Bounty Hunter, starring Golden, was presented at Joe's Pub in New York City on September 26, 2016. She starred in Broadway Bounty Hunter at the off-Broadway Greenwich House Theater in July 2019.

Acting credits

Filmography

Theatre

References

External links

1951 births
American film actresses
American musical theatre actresses
American television actresses
American stage actresses
Living people
Musicians from Brooklyn
Actresses from New York City
20th-century American actresses
21st-century American actresses
20th-century American singers
21st-century American singers
Singers from New York City
20th-century American women singers
21st-century American women singers